The 1997/1998 season in Dutch football was the 42nd season in the Eredivisie, where Ajax Amsterdam won the double, claiming the title and the Dutch National Cup.

Johan Cruijff-schaal

Eredivisie

Champions League : Ajax and PSV
UEFA Cup: Vitesse, Feyenoord and Willem II
Cup Winners Cup: SC Heerenveen
Promotion / relegation play-offs ("Nacompetitie"): RKC and FC Groningen
Relegated: FC Volendam

Topscorers

Awards

Dutch Footballer of the Year
 1997 — Jaap Stam (PSV Eindhoven)
 1998 – 1999 — Ruud van Nistelrooy (PSV Eindhoven)

Dutch Golden Shoe Winner
 1997 — Jaap Stam (PSV Eindhoven)
 1998 — Edwin van der Sar (Ajax Amsterdam)

Ajax Winning Squad 1997-'98

Goal
 Fred Grim
 Edwin van der Sar

Defence
 Danny Blind
 Frank de Boer
 Tim de Cler
 Mariano Juan
 Mario Melchiot
 Kofi Mensah
 Sunday Oliseh
 Tom Sier

 Raphael Supusepa
 Ole Tobiasen

Midfield
 Ronald de Boer
 Dani
 Dean Gorré
 Richard Knopper
 Jari Litmanen
 Martijn Reuser
 Andrzej Rudy
 Richard Witschge

Attack
 Shota Arveladze
 Tijani Babangida
 Andrey Demchenko
 Peter Hoekstra
 Michael Laudrup
 Benni McCarthy
 Andy van der Meyde
 Gerald Sibon

Management
 Morten Olsen (Coach)
 Heini Otto (Assistant)
 Bobby Haarms (Assistant)

Eerste Divisie

Promoted : AZ Alkmaar
Promotion / relegation play-offs ("Nacompetitie"): Cambuur, Emmen, Den Bosch, ADO Den Haag, Zwolle and Eindhoven

Promotion and relegation

Group A

Group B

Stayed / Promoted : RKC Waalwijk and Cambuur Leeuwarden
Relegated: FC Groningen

KNVB Cup

* The third place match was necessary to determine the Dutch Cup Winners Cup entrant, since both finalists (Ajax and PSV) were qualified for the Champions League.

Final

Dutch national team

References
 RSSSF Archive